The 2010 season is Cruzeiro's eighty-ninth season in existence and the club's fortieth consecutive season in the top flight of Brazilian football.

Squad
''As of 19 June 2010.

Professional players able to play in the junior team

Junior players with first team experience

Out on loan:

First-team staff

Competitions

Overview

Friendlies

Campeonato Mineiro

Standings

Matches

Quarterfinals

Semifinals

Campeonato Brasileiro

Standings

Matches

Copa Libertadores

First stage

Group 7

Round of 16

Quarterfinals

Statistics

Topscorers

See also
Cruzeiro Esporte Clube

References

External links
official website

Brazilian football clubs 2010 season
2010